Royal Prussian Jagdstaffel 45, commonly abbreviated to Jasta 45, was a "hunting group" (i.e., fighter squadron) of the Luftstreitkräfte, the air arm of the Imperial German Army during World War I. The squadron would score over 113 aerial victories during the war, including 28 observation balloons downed. The unit's victories came at the expense of four pilots killed in action, two injured in flying accidents, and five  wounded in action.

History
Jasta 45 was formed on 11 December 1917 at Flieger-Abteilung (Flier Detachment) 1 at Altenburg, Germany. It flew its first combat sorties on 9 January 1918, and scored its first aerial victory on the 20th. It was incorporated into Jagdgruppe 5 during July 1918. By the time it flew its final combat missions on 30 October 1918, the squadron was one of the highest scoring Jastas of 1918. Jasta 45 disbanded on 26 November 1918 at its point of origin.

Commanding officers (Staffelführer)
 Hans Rolfes: 17 December 1917
 Lothar Zencominierski: ca October–November 1918

Duty stations
 Marville, France: 25 December 1917
 Cohartville: 25 March 1918
 Vivaise, France
 Sissonne, France
 Mont-Saint-Martin, France
 Rocourt-Saint-Martin, France
 Arcy
 Mont-Notre-Dame, France
 Maizy, France
 Plomion, France
 Boulers

Notable personnel
 Gustav Dörr
 Karl Schlegel
 Hans Rolfes
 Arno Benzler
 Karl Meyer

Operations
Jasta 45 opened its career by supporting 5 Armee, beginning 25 December 1917. On 25 March 1918, it moved to support 7 Armee. It would remain in this assignment until war's end.

References

Bibliography
 

45
Military units and formations established in 1917
1917 establishments in Germany
Military units and formations disestablished in 1918